Gongsun Hong (公孫弘; Wade–Giles: Kung-sun Hung; 200 – 7 April 121 BCE) was a Chinese philosopher and politician in the Western Han dynasty under Emperor Wu. Together with the more famous Confucian scholar Dong Zhongshu, Gongsun was one of the earliest proponents of Confucianism, setting in motion its emergence under the Han court. The ideals both promoted, together with Gongsun's decrees, would come to be seen as values-in-themselves, becoming the "basic elements, or even hallmarks" of Confucianism. While first proposed and more ardently promoted by Dong, the national academy (then considered radical) and Imperial examination did not come into existence until they were supported by the more successful Gongsun. Their establishment set a precedent that would last into the twentieth century.

Gongsun was born in Zichuan within the Kingdom of Lu (part of present-day Shandong province). Beginning his political career at age sixty, Gongsun rapidly advanced from commoner to attain a senior appointment in 130BC when he was seventy, becoming grand secretary in 126 and chancellor in 124. One of the Three Dukes, in recognition of canonical mastery he was probably the first Han Confucian to be appointed to high office, the first commoner and first (and only, out of twelve of the time) Confucian to be made chancellor, as well as the first chancellor to be made marquis. He set a precedent for Confucianism as interpreter of portents.

Background
Preceding emperors, being more aligned with Huang-Lao, had instituted a policy of general non-interference with the people, reducing tax and other burdens, promoting government thrift and reduction in criminal sentences. A major issue however was the power possessed by princes of collateral lines of the imperial clan. The princes often built up their own military strengths and resisted edicts issued by the emperor. Emperor Wen's time saw the Lü Clan Disturbance, but he did not take any decisive actions on the overarching issue. His successor Emperor Jing managed to crush a revolt of the princes who were thereafter denied rights to appoint ministers for their fiefs, but their power persisted.

Sima Qian states Gongsun's background as that of a prison officer, who being dismissed, made his living as a farmhand tending pigs. Sima characterizes Gong (like Dong Zhongshu) as specializing in the Spring and Autumn Annals, but with a bent toward the Gongyang Zhuan commentaries as a disciple of Huwu Zidu. However, neither text is referenced in any of Gongsun's documents, and his actions don't seem to reflect the Gongyang. His family being poor, he did not learn much of the Annals until he was forty, and the Shiji considers his ability secondary to that of Dong Zhongshu.

Gongsun probably first expressed his views in 134 B.C. after the death of the Taoistic Empress Dowager, in response to a request by the Emperor Wu of Han for governmental advice. He applied to an advanced position in government through court examination. His discourse included ideas from Confucianism, administrative philosophy (Chinese Legalism) and Mohism; namely, that capable people ought to be employed in positions that match their talents (Mohism and Shen Buhai); secondly, encouraging high standards of morality, harmonious relationships, and employing moral persons (Confucianism and Mohism); and that common people should be allowed opportunity for farming while discouraging useless articles (Mohism and Shang Yang).

Speech
Referring to a typical golden age of the remote past in which the populace was naturally good, reminiscent of Lu Jia and Jia Yi he derides the practice of the Qin (that is, its penalties) as inadequate, stressing the Confucian values of sincerity, humaneness (ren), righteousness (yi), and moderation (li), but also intellectual judgement (zhi) as the means of effective authority. In what may have been the first time in history he evoked the Duke of Zhou (Zhou Gong) in his argument. As an influence on the basics of Confucianism, his stress on guidance through music (which Dong also stressed), li, and the habits of living is notable, while on the other hand he lacked Dong's cosmology.

Following this he gave a thinly veiled discourse on the "fundamentals of government" drawn seemingly straight from the Han Feizi; referring to the techniques (Shu) of government (originating in Shen Buhai), recommending firm personal control of the government, and "monopolization of the handles which control life" (Han Fei's Two Handles of reward and punishment). His discourse was rated low by the Ceremonial Superintendent, but among the top by the Emperor; though it may have been simple compared with Dong's, Sima writes that it was still very elegant.

Gongsun thereby attained the title of academician, leading Dong to claims that he attained high office from the autocratic Emperor through flattery. While Dong did not attain high office, the Han Shu records that Dong's career was still distinguished through the same call to service. Gongsun tried hard to sideline Dong, and would ultimately see his banishing, probably between 126-121BC. By making him chancellor of Weifang, Gongsun effectively prompted Dong's partial retirement from political life, probably paving the way for Gongsun's appropriation and usage of some of his proposals (namely the imperial examination), replacing them with more elaborate proposals. However, Gongsun still apparently preferred Dong's teachings to that of the Scholar Jiang of Xiaqiu.

Career
According to Sima Qian, beginning his career at age sixty, Gongsun would later end up sent as an envoy to the Xiongnu (northern nomadic confederation). He 
resigned ("because of illness") when his opinion on the matter differed from the Emperor's (Emperor Wu), but was brought back on general consensus despite Gongsun's reluctance. Thereafter he rarely disagreed with the emperor openly. At first arguing against it, he argues for Zhufu Yan's proposal for the development of the Shuofang commandery (a defensive position against the Xiongnu) at the expense of efforts to the south, only eventually succeeding.

In more legal policy, having begun his career as a scholar appointed for his knowledge of the Five Classics, and only later arriving at the legal, Gongsun would embellish the later with the former, greatly pleasing the emperor. Often mentioned together in the Shiji, Gongsun sang the praises of legal clerk Zhang Tang, whose policies needed legitimation, thereby strengthening each other's positions. Professor Griet Vankeerberghen refer to both him and Zhang as "quasi-Legalist bureaucrats". They instituted a law along the lines of Shang Yang, present during the Qin dynasty, that punished those with knowledge of a crime that failed to report it, or slandered prosecutors. According to the Taiping Yulan, Gongsun also wrote a highly valuable book on Xing-Ming (personnel selection), the doctrine of Shen Buhai, that may have been extant as late as the tenth century.

Servicing the emperor's wishes, they brought the government under tight central control, promoting an autocratic style of government. Eliminating their enemies through execution or transfer, they began what may be termed a political revolution putting a temporary end to group interests in the court, consolidating it with the death of Liu An in Huainan. The demotion of their enemy Ji An is notable, as a powerful representative of the Huang-Lao tradition favouring rich families. Drawing them as infringing on the Emperor's prerogatives and authority, Gongsun implies a comparison between the luxurious indulgence of Ji An's ilk to that of Guan Zhong as usurping the prerogatives of his lord – and is approved. In connection with this Gongsun wore plain clothes and ate plain food, as if to place himself on footing with minor officials or the people.

Other cases include Gongsun recommending the corrupt Zhufu Yan for execution (though Gongsun may have been covetous of his favour with the Emperor), and that the harsh official Ning Cheng not be appointed to government office, with the emperor making the latter commandant. Gongsun died of natural causes only a year after the Huainan trials. His son inherited his rank, becoming Grand Administrator of Zhejiang but lost it in a trial. Sima Qian states that he was replaced by Li Ts'ai.

Legacy
Contrary to Zhang Tang, who promoted his subordinates, Gongsun made no use of his position to advance other Confucians, and likely did not identify with the Confucian community, not hesitating to drive them from office. Michael Loewe states that, though regarded as one of the most respected statesmen, he was actually considered somewhat old-fashioned. Despite his political orientation, because he insisted on the value of trust over either law, rewards or penalties, Vankeerberghen considers Gongsun still reminiscent of Huang-Lao ideology like that of the Taoistic Huainanzi, the book of his opponents.

Professor Griet Vankeerberghen considers Gongsun to have promoted the virtues of frugality, modesty and incorruptibility, which might be said to have faded into the background. Pledging allegiance to the Emperor, he was innovative in defining absolutism in moral terms, espousing a conception of loyalty at odds with the times, and new standards of conduct to go with it. Following Gongsun scholars "took to supporting monarchical power", he and Zhang Tang achieving "nothing less than a tilting of the axis of the conventional moral compass toward a more legal-centric orientation."

Before Gongsun the selection of officials depended mainly on the judgment of senior officials, and the injunctions of the Emperor, though still referencing character. Only seven percent of officials at the time were Confucian. Gongsun's rapid rise would be celebrated as its success, but apart from attracting opportunists to Confucianism, also saw the ideas of "Chinese Legalism" work their way into Confucianism, and those espousing "Legalist" policies counted among their ranks.

Many were willing to follow Gongsun, while notable contemporaries like Dong Zhongshu, Ji An and historiographer Sima Qian called him and Zhang Tang flatterers and deceitful hypocrites, Gongsun receiving high salary while wearing simple clothes, and appearing lenient while inwardly uncompromising ("a suspicious man, outwardly magnanimous but inwardly scheming... he pretended to be friendly but repaid all wrongs" -Sima Qian), and accused him of subverting Confucianism. If nothing else, Gongsun could easily be said to have manipulated the legal system, and generally, did not openly state his own opinion in court (though these could hardly be considered particular to him).

Whatever the case, both lived frugal, if not charitable lives and established new standards of conduct. Though utilizing his virtues to further his career, Gongsun was said to be proficient, meticulous, yielding and filial. He was praised for giving away, at times, most of his salary to fellow scholars, to the point of having little left over for his family, only revealing this to the court at the charge of Ji An. After failing to suppress the rebellion in Huainan due to illness he accepted Ji An's criticism of hypocrisy.

While Sima states that Gongsun considered himself to have died without achieving merit, the early Later Han historian Ban Gu considered him to have outstanding ability. More recently, Sinologist Homer H. Dubs calls him "admirable in personal conduct, able in disputation, capable in legal matters, and an ornament to scholarship", while Tu Weiming calls him and Dong the heirs of Shusun Tong.

Notes

References

200 BC births
121 BC deaths
2nd-century BC Chinese writers
Chinese Confucianists
Han dynasty philosophers
Han dynasty politicians from Shandong